Novy is a rural locality (a settlement) in Zimaryovsky Selsoviet, Kalmansky District, Altai Krai, Russia. The population was 205 as of 2013. There are 7 streets.

Geography 
Novy is located 40 km north of Kalmanka (the district's administrative centre) by road. Prudskoy and Zimari are the nearest rural localities.

References 

Rural localities in Kalmansky District